The Filmfare Award for Best Film is given by the Filmfare magazine as part of its annual Filmfare Awards for Hindi films.

The award was first given in 1954. Here is a list of the award winners and the nominees of the respective years. Each individual entry shows the title followed by the production company and the producer.

Yash Raj Films has produced 18 films that have been nominated, the most for any production house. It also shares the most wins at 4 along with Bimal Roy Productions and UTV Motion Pictures. While Yash Chopra has been the producer of all of the winning films of Yash Raj Films, Bimal Roy has been the producer of all of the winning films of Bimal Roy Productions, thus making them the producers with the most wins. Bimal Roy, Yash Chopra, and Sanjay Leela Bhansali have each directed 4 winning films, the most for any director. Aamir Khan has starred in 9 winning films which is the most for any actor in a leading role. Nutan, Madhuri Dixit, Aishwarya Rai, and Rani Mukerji have each starred in 3 winning films which is the most for any actress in a leading role.

Winners and nominees

1950s

1960s

1970s

1980s

1990s

2000s

2010s

2020s

Special 50 Year Award

In 2005, Filmfare announced the best film of the last 50 years as Sholay, although the film did not win the Filmfare Award for Best Film in its year of release.

See also
 Filmfare Critics Award for Best Movie
 Filmfare Awards
 Bollywood
 Cinema of India

References

External links
Filmfare Awards Best Film

F
Awards for best film